The Business Information System (BIS;) is a Finnish government service jointly maintained by the  (PRH) and the Finnish Tax Administration providing an access to the Finnish Trade Register and the  and an ability to file information for both agencies. The name is an abbreviation of the Finnish full name Yritys- ja yhteisötietojärjestelmä.

Searching companies in the Finnish Trade Register can be made with the name of the company or the Business ID.

References

External links 
 

Economy of Finland
Information systems